St. Clements is a former provincial electoral division in Manitoba, Canada, which existed on two separate occasions.  The original constituency was one of twenty-four established at the province's creation in 1870.  It was eliminated through redistribution before the 1888 provincial election, but was restored for the 1914 election.  The division was eliminated for the second time by redistribution prior to the 1958 election.

St. Clements was located to the northeast of Winnipeg.  After its elimination, much of its territory was included in the new constituency of Brokenhead.

Provincial representatives

Election results

1870 general election

1874 general election

1878 general election

1879 general election

1883 general election

1886 general election

1914 general election

1915 general election

1920 general election

1922 general election

1927 general election

1932 general election

1936 general election

1941 general election

1945 general election

1949 general election

1950 by-election

1953 general election

References

Former provincial electoral districts of Manitoba